John R. Lewis (born November 2, 1954) is a Republican politician from California who represented Orange County in the California State Senate from 1991 until 2000 and in the California State Assembly from 1980 until 1991. He currently serves as the President of the Lewis Consulting Group.

During his time in the State Senate, Lewis served as the Vice Chairman of the Senate Rules Committee.

Lewis was first elected to the State Senate in 1991 after John Seymour resigned after being appointed to the United States Senate by Governor Pete Wilson. In the Republican primary, Lewis defeated both Assemblymembers Nolan Frizzelle and Doris Allen of Cypress, California who later served briefly as Speaker of the Assembly.

Lewis is an alumnus of University of Southern California.

References

External links
Join California John Lewis

Living people
Republican Party members of the California State Assembly
Republican Party California state senators
1954 births
20th-century American politicians